Il Flaminio is a 1735 opera buffa by Giovanni Battista Pergolesi to a Neapolitan libretto by Gennaro Antonio Federico, first performed at the Teatro Nuovo, Naples. Untypically in Pergolesi's difficult and short career the opera was an immediate success and continued to be staged up to 1750.

Roles

Recordings
DVD The Teatro Valeria Mstinaoriconi, Jesi 2010 Juan Francisco Gatell (Polidoro), Laura Polverelli (Flaminio), Marina De Liso (Giustina), Sonia Yoncheva (Agata) & Serena Malfi (Ferdinando) Accademia Bizantina, Ottavio Dantone (conductor) & Michal Znaniecki (stage director)

References

Operas
Opera buffa
1735 operas
Italian-language operas
Operas set in Italy
Operas by Giovanni Battista Pergolesi